The Pontifical Commission for the Protection of Minors is a pontifical commission within the Roman Curia of the Catholic Church instituted by Pope Francis on 22 March 2014 as an advisory agency serving the pope. Since 5 June 2022, the Commission has been part of the Dicastery for the Doctrine of the Faith, operating with its own officials and according to its own norms.

Cardinal Seán O'Malley, Archbishop of Boston, has been its first and current president since 17 December 2014.

Task
Pope Francis's chirograph for the Institution of a Pontifical Commission for the Protection of minors (22 March 2014) states:

His apostolic consecration Praedicate evangelium (19 March 2022) states:

Organisation
The pope appoints the Commission's president and secretary and members to five-year terms. The members need not be clerics; all are to be "distinguished by science, proven ability and pastoral experience". The Commission advises the pope and proposes "initiatives for the protection of minors and vulnerable persons". It assists bishops and their organizations as well as all forms of religious associations "in developing appropriate strategies and procedures [...] to protect minors and vulnerable persons from sexual abuse and to provide an adequate response to such conduct by the clergy' and other religious. In doing so it follows "canonical norms" and considers as well "the requirements of civil law". Though part of the Dicastery for the Doctrine of the Faith, the Commission has its own officials and operates according to its own norms.

History

Creation
On 5 December 2013, following a meeting of the Council of Cardinal Advisers, Cardinal Seán O'Malley announced that Pope Francis had decided to create a commission for the protection of minors to evaluate current programs, propose initiatives, and identify personnel to implement them, "including lay persons, religious and priests with responsibilities for the safety of children, in relations with the victims, in mental health, in the application of the law, etc." Pope Francis created the Pontifical Commission for the Protection of Minors and named its first eight members on 22 March 2014. They were tasked with drafting the Commission's statutes to "define its tasks and competencies".

On 10 September 2014, Father Robert W. Oliver, the chief prosecutor of clergy for sex abuse crimes at the Congregation for the Doctrine of the Faith, was named the Commission's secretary. On 17 December 2014, Pope Francis added eight members to the Commission, including a second abuse survivor, Peter Saunders, head of a UK-based organization of sexual abuse survivors, and experts from five continents, bringing the total to 17 (the original right, the secretary, and the additional eight), eight of them women. This announcement identified O'Malley as president of the Commission for the first time.

The Commission met for the first time on 6–8 February 2015, and on 8 May released the Commission's statutes, which were dated 21 April 2015.

The statutes declared the Commission "an autonomous institution attached to the Holy See". It was to propose initiatives to promote local responsibility, based on extensive consultations church officials, including local jurisdictions, organizations of religious, and Curial departments. Its maximum membership was set at 18, appointed to three-year terms. The terms of the president and secretary may be renewed. It details the procedures for meetings, setting the Commission's agenda, and delegating questions to work groups. The norms described were given force for three years, at which point the members could propose modifications.

Developments 
In 2015, Commission member Marie Collins, former victim of abuse, has criticized the Vatican for failing to sufficiently fund the panel, a problem she claims could jeopardize the commission’s work. The commission has been advised to consider raising its own funds to complete the work.

In February 2016, the commission members watched the Oscar-nominated film Spotlight together. The movie dramatizes the 2001 experience of the Pulitzer Prize-winning investigative team at the Boston Globe as they uncovered and exposed systematic sex abuse and subsequent cover-ups by clergy and members of the church hierarchy in Boston.

In February 2017,  Marie Collins resigned from the commission stating: "there are still men at that level in the church who would resist or hinder work to protect children in 2017, it's just not acceptable".

2018 relaunch 
Upon the expiration of the members' terms in December 2017, on 17 February 2018 Pope Francis relaunched the commission with major personnel changes. He reappointed O'Malley, Oliver and six other members and adding nine new members, eight men and eight women. Several of those members of the commission are victims of clerical sexual abuse, but the commission said it would respect their decision not to identify themselves publicly.

Merger 
Since 5 June 2022, the Commission has been part of the Dicastery for the Doctrine of the Faith, operating with its own officials and according to its own norms, as prescribed by the apostolic constitution Praedicate evangelium.

Pope Francis explained that the Commission was placed there because that Dicastery "deals with sexual abuse on the part of members of the clergy" and it was "not possible to have a 'satellite commission', circling around but unattached to the organization chart." He told the members of the Commission: "Someone might think that this could put at risk your freedom of thought and action, or even take away importance from the issue with which you deal. That is not my intention, nor is it my expectation. And I invite you to be watchful that this does not happen." Commission secretary pro tempore Fr. Andrew Small, O.M.I. described the relationship as tying the Dicastery's role in "the administration of justice" to the Commission's "focus on safeguarding and protection".

See also
Vos estis lux mundi
Ecclesiastical response to Catholic sex abuse cases

Notes

References

External links
 

 
Pope Francis
2014 establishments in Vatican City
Pontifical commissions